Sonja Anita Maria Bernadotte, Countess of Wisborg ( Haunz; 7 May 1944 – 21 October 2008) was the second wife of Count Lennart Bernadotte, son of Prince Wilhelm of Sweden and grandson of King Gustaf V. Vilhelm was Gustaf's second son.

Biography

She managed the Mainau estate on Lake Constance in southern Germany which her late husband purchased in 1951 from his father. The Mainau estate serves as Lake Constance's main tourist attraction, featuring elaborate floral gardens, a butterfly house, and attractive views of the lake. Bernadotte became the Count's second wife in 1972. After the death of the Count in 2004, Sonja Bernadotte became head of the foundation that organizes Nobel Laureate Meetings at Lindau, a scientific conference held yearly in Lindau, inviting Nobel prize winners interact with young researchers from all over the world.

Marriage and family 
In 1969, Sonja met her future husband Count Lennart Bernadotte of Wisborg whilst she was working as his personal assistant. Lennart was thirty-five years older than Sonja, to the very day—their birthdays were only one day apart. Lennart was married and the father of four adult children. He divorced his wife of almost forty years, with whom his relations had been uneven for some years, in order to marry Sonja.

The wedding of Count Lennart and Countess Sonja took place on 29 April 1972. The couple had five children together:

 Countess Bettina Bernadotte of Wisborg; born 12 March 1974 in Scherzingen, Switzerland. On 29 October 2004, she married Philipp Haug and they have three children.
 Count Björn Bernadotte of Wisborg; born on 13 June 1975 in Scherzingen, Switzerland.
 Countess Catharina Bernadotte of Wisborg; born on 11 April 1977 in Scherzingen, Switzerland. On 30 January 2007, Countess Catharina married Romauld Ruffing in a civil ceremony and religiously on 7 July 2007.
 Count Christian Bernadotte of Wisborg; born on 24 May 1979 in Scherzingen, Switzerland.
 Countess Diana Bernadotte of Wisborg; born on 18 April 1982 in Scherzingen, Switzerland. On 27 September 2003, she married Bernd Grawe and they have one daughter. They divorced in 2007. On 13 January 2017, she married Stefan Dedek.

According to her husband's memoirs Sonja Bernadotte would not allow anyone to address them as a prince or princess.

Death 
Sonja Bernadotte died of breast cancer in Freiburg im Breisgau, Germany, aged 64.

References 

1944 births
2008 deaths
Sonja
Deaths from cancer in Germany
Deaths from breast cancer
Veitch Memorial Medal recipients
Officers Crosses of the Order of Merit of the Federal Republic of Germany
Recipients of the Order of Merit of Baden-Württemberg